Reigate Priory is a Grade I listed building in Reigate, Surrey.

The building now contains a museum and Reigate Priory Junior School.

References

Grade I listed buildings in Surrey
Reigate